The Greek Women's Water Polo Super Cup is a Water Polo club competition in Greece since 2020. It is an annual match contested between the Greek A1 Ethniki Women Champion and the Cup Winner of the same year. The matches take place in different locations every time. Olympiacos has the most Super Cups.

The matches

Performance by club

References

External links
Hellenic Swimming Federation 

Water polo competitions in Greece
Competitions in Greece
Water polo competitions
Sport in Greece